The Greensboro Fire Department provides fire protection and emergency medical services to the city of Greensboro, North Carolina.

The Greensboro Fire Department was started as an all volunteer fire department in 1884 with the Steam Fire Engine Company Number 1. Due to population growth and concerns over resource management, the department transitioned to career members in 1926.

Stations and apparatus 
 this is the current list of apparatus in the Greensboro Fire Department:

References

Fire
Fire departments in North Carolina